Crimson Joy is the 15th Spenser novel by Robert B. Parker.

The story follows Boston based PI Spenser as he tracks a serial killer the press has dubbed the "Red Rose Killer".

The killer turns out to be a therapeutic patient of Spenser's girlfriend Susan Silverman, challenging their safety and testing their relationship.

Recurring characters
Spenser
Hawk
Dr. Susan Silverman, Ph.D
Lt. Martin Quirk, Boston Police Department
Sgt. Frank Belson, Boston Police Department
Tony Marcus
Henry Cimoli
Wayne Cosgrove

Mentioned but not seen:
Rita Fiore
Paul Giacomin
Linda Thomas

External links
 Parker's page on the book

1988 American novels
Spenser (novel series)
Novels set in Boston